Consort Yu (died 202 BC), also known as "Yu the Beauty", was the wife of the warlord Xiang Yu, who competed with Liu Bang (Emperor Gao), the founder of the Han dynasty, for supremacy over China in the Chu–Han Contention (206–202 BC).

Life
Consort Yu's true name and birth date are unknown and there are two accounts of her origin. The first said she was from Yanji Town in Shuyang County, while the other claimed that she was from Suzhou, but both pointed that she was born in present-day Jiangsu.

In 209 BC, Xiang Yu and his uncle Xiang Liang started a revolution to overthrow the Qin dynasty. Consort Yu's elder brother, Yu Ziqi, was serving in Xiang Liang's army as a general then. Consort Yu met Xiang Yu, fell in love with him and became his wife. Since then, she had been following Xiang Yu on his military campaigns and refused to remain behind. She accompanied him on all battles.

In 202 BC, Xiang Yu was besieged in the Battle of Gaixia by the combined forces of Liu Bang (King of Han), Han Xin and Peng Yue. The Han army started to sing folk songs from Xiang Yu's native land of Chu to create a false impression that they had captured Chu. The morale of Xiang Yu's troops plummeted and several soldiers deserted. In despair, Xiang Yu indulged in alcohol and sang the Song of Gaixia to express his sorrow. Consort Yu performed a sword dance and sang a verse in return. To prevent Xiang Yu from being distracted by his love for her, Consort Yu committed suicide with Xiang Yu's sword after singing. She was buried at Gaixia.

A "Consort Yu Tomb" stands in present-day Lingbi County, Anhui.

Song of Consort Yu
This verse was sung by Consort Yu after Xiang Yu sang the Song of Gaixia. She committed suicide with Xiang Yu's sword after singing.

In popular culture
The romance of Xiang Yu and Consort Yu has been the subject of plays, films and television series, even though not much about Consort Yu was recorded in history. The story was reenacted on stage in the Peking opera The Hegemon-King Bids His Lady Farewell. Poets such as Su Shi, He Pu and Yuan Mei have written poems about Consort Yu as well. Actresses such as Idy Chan, Melissa Ng, Kristy Yang, Rosamund Kwan and Liu Yifei have played the role of Consort Yu in films and television series. The 2012 TV drama series Beauties of the Emperor had her full given name as "Yu Miaoyi", which is artistic license as her actual full name was not historically recorded. 

In the video game Fate/Grand Order, Consort Yu is an Assassin-class Servant, later a Lancer-class Servant, voiced by Mariya Ise. Here, she is a elemental spirit similar to a vampire, a xian and zhenren who survived to the present day under the alias Hinako Akuta and desires to reunite with Xiang Yu, who in an alternate universe, is unexpectedly a monstrous robotic Centaur programmed by Qin Shi Huang under the code name Huiji-Yishi. The Japanese version of the game refers to her as "Gu Bijin", the Japanese equivalent of "Yu Meiren", while the English version uses the Chinese reading.

Along with Xiang Yu, Yu Meiren appears in Shin Sangoku Musou Multi Raid 2, where they are resurrected by Shi Huangdi to fight against the heroes of the Three Kingdoms.

References

 Sima Qian. Records of the Grand Historian, Volume 7, Biography of Xiang Yu.

202 BC deaths
Women in ancient Chinese warfare
Chu–Han contention people
Year of birth unknown
3rd-century BC Chinese women writers
3rd-century BC Chinese women
3rd-century BC Chinese people
3rd-century BC Chinese writers
Suicides in the Chu–Han contention